Donald Fish (born Sydney 25 April 1929) is an Australian graphic designer, illustrator, cartoonist, award-winning poster designer and writer.

Between 1945 and 2005, Fish produced logotypes, packaging, illustrations and TV commercials as well as award-winning Australian poster designs for both business and the arts. One award-winning television commercial for British Airways featured John Le Mesurier was produced with John Flanagan and won a Bronze Lion at the Venice Film Festival.

References

External links 
 
 
 

Australian graphic designers
Australian illustrators
Living people
1929 births